= Hans Luder =

Hans Luder may refer to:

- Hans Luder, coach of FC Thun 1945-48
- Hans Luder, father of the theologian Martin Luther
